The 2014 Mr. Olympia contest 
was an IFBB professional bodybuilding competition and part of Joe Weider's Olympia Fitness & Performance Weekend 2014
that was held on September 18–21, 2014, at the South Hall in the Las Vegas Convention Center in Winchester, Nevada and in the Orleans Arena at The Orleans Hotel and Casino in Paradise, Nevada. It was the 50th Mr. Olympia competition celebrated. Other events at the exhibition included the 212 Olympia Showdown, Ms. Olympia, Fitness Olympia, Figure Olympia, Bikini Olympia, Women's Physique Showdown, and Men's Physique Showdown contests.

Results
A total prize pool of $710,000 was awarded.

See also
 2014 Ms. Olympia
 2014 Men's Physique Showdown

References

External links 
 Official website

 2014
Mr. Olympia
2014 in bodybuilding
Mr. Olympia 2014